Hurtubise is a Canadian surname. Notable people with this name include:

Jacques Hurtubise (painter) (1939–2014), Montreal-born and Nova Scotia-based abstract expressionist
Jacques Hurtubise (cartoonist), (1950–2015), aka Zyx, Canadian cartoonist, founder of Croc magazine, and political candidate
Jacques Hurtubise (mathematician) (b. 1957), Rhodes Scholar and McGill University professor
Jim Hurtubise (1932–1989), American race car driver
Louise Hurtubise (b. 1953), Canadian handball player at the 1976 Olympics
Mark Hurtubise (b. 1984), professional ice hockey player
Raoul Hurtubise (1882–1955), Canadian Senator for Nipissing
Troy Hurtubise (1963–2018), Canadian inventor and conservationist

See also
Hurtubise House in Westmount, Quebec
Jacques Hurtubise (disambiguation)